Harry Newton Hempstead (June 25, 1868 – March 26, 1938) was the owner of the New York Giants of the National League from 1912 through 1919.

Biography
He was born on June 25, 1868 in Philadelphia to Orlando Gordon Hempstead and Elizabeth Ophelia Tyler. He graduated from Lafayette College in 1891 and on October 10, 1894 he married Eleanor Gordon Brush. In 1912 he purchased the franchise from John T. Brush, his father-in-law.  In 1919, he sold the franchise to Charles Stoneham. He died on March 26, 1938 at his home on Park Avenue in Manhattan.

From 1916 to 1924 he was a trustee of his alma mater, Lafayette College.

References

External links
San Francisco Giants owners

Major League Baseball executives
New York Giants (NL) executives
New York Giants (NL) owners
1868 births
1938 deaths
Lafayette College trustees
Lafayette College alumni